F. formosa may refer to:

 Fissurella formosa, a sea snail
 Fodinoidea formosa, a Malagasy moth
 Fouquieria formosa, a desert plant